Thyris is a genus of moths of the family Thyrididae.

Species
Thyris borealis
Thyris diaphana
Thyris euxina
Thyris fenestrella
Thyris kasachstanica
Thyris maculata
Thyris nigra
Thyris siberica
Thyris sinicaensis
Thyris tarbagataica
Thyris usitata
Thyris ussuriensis
Thyris vitrina

References

 , 1990: Thyris sinicaensis sp.nov., ein chinesisches Fensterschwärmerchen (Lepidoptera, Thyridae). Entomofauna 11 (1): 1–8.
  1999. New and Little Known Moth Species (Lepidoptera: Thyrididae, Brachodidae) in the Fauna of Russia and Neighboring Territories: XI1. Entomological Review 79(6): 679-690.
  1987 - Family Thyrididae

Thyrididae
Moth genera